Olympiastadion is a stadium located in Munich, Germany. Situated at the heart of the Olympiapark München in northern Munich, the stadium was the main venue for the 1972 Summer Olympics.

The original capacity was maximally and officially around 75,000 seats, during the Olympics; yet average audiences of 80.000 to 90.000 people were registered daily. Also the stadium has hosted many major football matches including the 1974 FIFA World Cup Final and the UEFA Euro 1988 Final – originally the official capacity was 73.000 for football. The stadium hosted the European Cup Finals in 1979, 1993 and 1997. Its current capacity is 69,250. The stadium could support until 11,800 standing places and 57,450 seats; or alternatively 63,540 seated spectators.The roof covers around 40,000 seats. 

Until the construction of Allianz Arena for the 2006 FIFA World Cup, the stadium was home to FC Bayern Munich and TSV 1860 Munich. Unlike the Olympiastadion, the new stadium was purpose-built for football alone.

Design

Designed by the German architect Günther Behnisch and the engineer Frei Otto, with the assistance of John Argyris, the lightweight tent construction of the Olympiastadion was considered revolutionary for its time. This included large sweeping canopies of acrylic glass stabilized by steel cables that were used for the first time on a large scale. The idea was to imitate the Alps skyline and to set a counterpart to the 1936 Summer Olympics in Berlin, held during the Nazi regime. The sweeping and transparent canopy was designed to symbolize the new, democratic and optimistic West Germany. This concept was reflected in the official motto: "The cheerful Games" ("Die Heiteren Spiele").

History
Shortly after World War I, there were first considerations to build a large stadium in Munich, as football gained popularity. A stadium construction on Oberwiesenfeld failed in 1919 due to an objection by the Bavarian state. 1921 the Teutoniaplatz was opened by the club FC Teutonia with a capacity of 12,000. In the month after the opening about 20,000 guests came to a game, which was almost twice the officially allowed capacity. The FC Bayern used the Teutoniaplatz for his home games from 1923 to 1925. Starting in 1911, the TSV 1860 played on the club's own field at the Grünwalder Straße in Giesing, which became the largest stadium in Munich after it was expanded to a capacity of 40,000 spectators in 1926.

Although the capacity was sufficient for championship operation, the Teutoniaplatz was filled to its limits in international matches: the game Germany against Switzerland in 1926 showed that the demand for tickets in major events was a much higher than the allowed capacity. The 1928 opened fight course on the Dantestraße did not meet the expectations of a large stadium. For this reason, the construction of a large stadium on the outskirts of Munich, for example on Oberwiesenfeld, was discussed during the Weimar Republic, but did not yield any particular results.

In the early Nazi Germany, local politicians of the NSDAP planned the construction of a stadium west of Munich-Riem Airport with a capacity of 60,000 to 80,000, mirroring the Reichssportfeld in Berlin. However, the airport administration resisted and the Generalbaurat of Munich did not set it as a target. With the outbreak of World War II, the plans were finally rejected.

After the end of the war, the crowds flocked back to the football stadiums at weekends, including in Munich. In 1948, 58,200 spectators visited a game of TSV 1860 against the 1st FC Nuremberg in the stadium on the Grünwalder road, intended for only 45,000 visitors. A year later, 57,000 spectators came to Munich for the semi-final match of the German Championship between 1. FC Kaiserslautern and Borussia Dortmund. The postwar period is today considered the "golden age" of football in Germany; only since the 1990s have so many visitors come to the German stadiums.

The Grünwalder Stadion, which was destroyed in the war, offered space for 50,000 spectators after the renovation, making it the largest stadium in Munich. However, the Municipal Sports Committee considered the capacity to be too low and sought to expand it to a capacity of 75,000 spectators. The Sports Committee received backlash from local media. For example, the Münchner Merkur asked for the construction of a new stadium on the Oberwiesenfeld in early 1951, after the extended grandstand of the Grünwalder Stadium would have made the construction of the planned Mittlerer Ring as the main access road to the Federal Highway 8 difficult. The major stadium project came to an end with the adoption of the so-called ten-year program on 10 March 1955 which promoted the construction of district sports facilities.

Another reason for this decision was the decreased popularity of football in Munich, after the formerly successful city clubs such as TSV 1860, FC Wacker and FC Bayern underperformed. Because of the small capacity of the Grünwalder Stadium, games of the Germany national team had not been held in Munich since 1940. For the big city clubs, the capacity of the Grünwalder stadium was adequate.

In 1958, the Bavarian party revived the talks of a large stadium. Both FC Bayern and the TSV 1860 resisted the project, fearing that the capacity would not be exhausted anyway. In 1963, in the last season before the introduction of the Bundesliga, the TSV 1860 won the league championship and therefore secured the starting place in the first league for the following season. In the first Bundesliga season, the TSV 1860 had an average of just under 32,000 spectators per game, which far exceeded the average of the previous years of about 20,000. In 1964, the TSV 1860 qualified for the European Cup Winners' Cup 1964/65 by winning the DFB Cup in the preseason, and had constantly more than 30,000 spectators during the course of the competition. In the same year, the FC Bayern became champion of the Regionalliga Süd and qualified for the promotion round to the Bundesliga. The capacity of the Grünwalder Stadium once again proved to be too low. In the following season the TSV 1860 won the championship and FC Bayern the national cup competition. Although the average number of spectators was far lower than the maximum capacity of the Grünwalder Stadium, there were already numerous games in the mid-1960s at which the ticket demand was higher than the capacity of the stadium.

Munich was the only German city with two Bundesliga clubs, which at this time always played in the top table positions and were temporarily represented in international competitions. Therefore, the largest stadium in the city was now again found to be too small. In order to maintain the high level of the Munich football clubs, a larger stadium was considered necessary, because the audience still represented the main source of income of the clubs at that time.

Meanwhile, Georg Brauchle, then deputy Mayor of Munich, tried to bring the 1972 Summer Olympic Games to Munich. In October 1965, Mayor Hans-Jochen Vogel and Willi Daume, President of the West Germany National Olympic Committee, decided to test the city's suitability for the Games. After further talks, among others with Federal Chancellor Ludwig Erhard and Bavaria's Prime Minister Alfons Goppel, they came to the conclusion that an application for the 1972 Summer Olympics could be worthwhile. For this, however, a new and modern stadium had to be built for the city.

Planning

The three square kilometer and largely undeveloped Oberwiesenfeld was selected as the centerpiece of the Olympic Games. Due to the proximity to the city center, Munich was able to promote the games with the slogan "Olympia of the short ways", which contributed to the decision-making process. Since the Oberwiesenfeld had served as a parade ground of the Bavarian cavalry regiment and later mainly military purposes, it was – except for armaments works – free of buildings. From 1931 to 1939 the Munich Airport was located on the Oberwiesenfeld. After the World War II, the debris rubble of the bombing of the city was piled up, from which the Olympic Mountain emerged. This was intentionally created in an oval shape, so that it could be used as a tribune foundation for a stadium.

In 1964, Munich opened an architectural competition for the planning of a large stadium, which was won by the offices of Henschker from Brunswick and Deiss from Munich. Their stadium design was integrated into an overall concept. In the planning of 1965, the stadium was planned to hold around 100,000 spectators, although later the capacity was reduced for the purpose of reusability. The plans were integrated into an overall concept, with the addition of a multi-purpose arena and a swimming pool on a large, concrete surface. Under the concrete slabs, supply systems and parking lots were to be built. On 26 April 1966, the IOC announced that Munich had prevailed against the other candidates Detroit, Madrid and Montreal. Thus the stadium construction was decided. The original plans of the Olympic Park and the stadium were criticized because of a lack of unity in the urban planning. In addition, the Association of German Architects suggested to avoid any monumentality at the sports facilities because of the Nazi past. The plans were finally rejected.

In February 1967, an architectural competition was again advertised, in which by the deadline of 3 July 1967 a total of 104 drafts were submitted, one of which came from the architectural firm Behnisch & Partner. The architect Günter Behnisch and his employee Fritz Auer planned to build the stadium, the Olympic Hall and the swimming pool closely adjacent to each other west of the Olympic Tower, for which the base already existed. When a model was built at a scale of 1: 1000, the employee Cordel Wehrse came up with the idea of laying a tent roof construction over the three buildings. He had become aware of Frei Otto's tent roof construction at the World Fair in Montreal through a newspaper article. Together with Carlo Weber and Heinz Isler the model was supplemented with wooden sticks and parts of a women's stocking. The architects thought of the Olympic roof as a circus tent.

Finally, the model was submitted on the deadline. It was already eliminated after the first round by the jury, as it was considered too daring. However, the juror Egon Eiermann intervened and campaigned together with Mayor Hans-Jochen Vogel and NOK President Willi Daume, among others, for the model. Ultimately, the reviewers voted for the plan of Behnisch & Partner, which emerged as the winner of the competition. The decision was announced on 13 October 1967. In addition to the stadium designed for 90,000 spectators, which was then reduced to maximally 75,000. The model convinced with its surrounding landscape architecture and the tent roof construction. Thus, it fulfilled the leitmotif of the games: human scale, lightness, bold elegance and unity of the landscape with nature. In addition, the possibility of reuse was given. Even with regard to short distances, the model convinced the jury.

Election
To make room for the arena, the terminal building of the old airport had to be blown up. On 9 June 1969 work began on the stadium, the multi-purpose Olympic arena and swimming pool. However, it was only on 14 July 1969 with the laying of the cornerstone in a symbolic ceremony that the construction officially begun. In addition to the three buildings emerging on the Oberwiesenfeld, the Werner von Linde Hall, a volleyball hall, the Olympic Radstadion, the Olympic Village and various other buildings such as stations for U-Bahn and S-Bahn were built. During the time of the construction there was a spirit of optimism in Munich. The inner city received a pedestrian zone between Marienplatz and the Stachus and the metro was implemented. on the Oberwiesenfeld alone, there were 60 construction sites. From a total of 1.35 billion German marks, 137 million were used in the construction of the Olympic Stadium and another 170.6 million in the tent roof. About 5,000 construction workers worked at the construction site for more than one million hours. Contrary to the custom of German construction, the Olympic Stadium was built largely without prefabricated parts.

According to Behnisch, the stadium was to be a "democratic sports venue" according to the ideas of the Mayor of Munich Hans-Jochen Vogel and the specifications of the Federal Chancellor Willy Brandt, creating a contrast to the 1936 Summer Olympics in Berlin during the period of National Socialism, the hitherto single summer Olympics in Germany. Since the time of National Socialism, Munich had the reputation of being the "capital of the Nazi movement". The Olympics were intended to help improve Munich's reputation. The foundation's deed stated that the planned games should "bear witness to the spirit of our people in the last third of the 20th century".

Behnisch wanted Frei Otto as a partner architect, whose tent roof construction at the EXPO 1967 in Montreal was a model for the stadium tent roof. Otto had already been involved in numerous construction projects with suspended and membrane structures and became the development consultant for the Olympiastadion tent roof construction. In addition to Behnisch and Otto, an architect team was also formed to realize the roof construction, including Fritz Leonhardt and Wolf Andrä. The planning management was done by Fritz Auer. Otto developed parts of the roof by means of the trial-and-error principle by making larger models of the roof construction, while Andrä and Leonhardt developed the roof with a CAD program elsewhere. Under the direction of civil engineer Jörg Schlaich, the roof over the stadium was completed on 21 April 1972. But the planned flat tent roof to cover an additional 15,000 seats in the eastern stands of the stadium, was never built; only the main foundations to hold the second roof were built, and they are still visible; one in each of the curves: behind, respectively under the existing roof. (In total some 60,000 seats would have been covered by the two separate tent roofs.)

Already in the summer of 1970 the shell of the buildings was finished and on 23 July 1970 the topping-out ceremony was celebrated. The plans for the stadium had forgotten to allocate cabins for football teams in the stadium interior. For this reason, from 24 May 1972 to the official opening of the stadium on 26 May 1972, two medical rooms were provisionally converted into changing rooms. There was enough room to set up a room for paramedics and referees as well. Later, the cabins were further equipped and remained in place. At the turn of the year 1971/1972 the main works were finished and at the end of June 1972 the finished buildings were handed over to the organizing committee. The planning, construction and financing of the buildings were controlled by the 1967 founded Olympia-Baugesellschaft mbH Munich, which was founded by the Federal Republic of Germany, the Free State of Bavaria and the City of Munich. The stadium is property of the Olympiapark München GmbH, a society wholly owned by the City of Munich's Referat für Arbeit und Wirtschaft.

Post Olympic legacy

Following the Olympics, the stadium became the home of FC Bayern Munich. In 1979 the ground was host to the 1979 European Cup Final in which Nottingham Forest won the first of their consecutive European Cups.

In the 1990s Bayern Munich's rivals TSV 1860 Munich moved into the stadium. The two teams coexisted in the Olympiastadion until 2005, when both clubs moved to the purpose built Allianz Arena.

Borussia Dortmund won the 1997 UEFA Champions League Final at the Olympiastadion.

On 6 to 11 August 2002 the 18th European Athletics Championships were held at the Olympiastadion and the event will repeat in 15–21 August 2022.

Since 2005, it is the host of the yearly air and style snowboard event.

On 31 December 2006, the stadium made history as being the first venue to host the Tour de Ski cross-country skiing competition. The individual sprint events, held at 1100 m, were won by Norway's Marit Bjørgen (women) and Switzerland's Christoph Eigenmann (men). The snow was made in the stadium by combining the hot air with the cold refrigerated water that causes the snow to act like the icy type one would see in the Alps.

It was not used in the 2006 FIFA World Cup due to the Allianz Arena being the host stadium in Munich.

On 23 to 24 June 2007, the stadium was host to the Spar European Cup 2007, a yearly athletics event featuring the top 8 countries from around Europe.

The DTM touring car series held its first stadium event there in 2011: a Race of Champions-style event which took part over a two-day period, although it was not a championship scoring round. Edoardo Mortara won the first day, and Bruno Spengler the second. The event was repeated in 2012, but the stadium withdrew in 2013 because it proved impossible to turn it into a points-scoring event.

On 17 May 2012, the ground played host to the 2012 UEFA Women's Champions League Final in which Olympique Lyonnais won their second consecutive trophy. The attendance of that game was a record for a UEFA Women's Champions League Final.
On 19 May 2012 it hosted the "Public Viewing" of the 2012 UEFA Champions League Final which took place at Allianz Arena in Munich.

In August 2020, it was announced that Türkgücü München who have been promoted into third division will be playing a couple of their home matches on the ground. 
On 10 October 2020, after more than eight years, Olympiastadion was due to host a professional football match of Türkgücü München against SV Wehen Wiesbaden.

The 2022 European Athletics Championships took place at the stadium.

Association football

1974 FIFA World Cup
The stadium was one of the venues for the 1974 FIFA World Cup.

The following games were played at the stadium during the World Cup of 1974:

UEFA Euro 1988
The stadium was one of the venues for the UEFA Euro 1988.

The following games were played at the stadium during the Euro 1988:

Germany and West Germany national football team matches held at the stadium

26 May 1972 West Germany – USSR 4–1 (Friendly, stadium opener)
9 May 1973 West Germany – Yugoslavia 0–1 (Friendly)
7 July 1974 West Germany – Netherlands 2–1 (1974 World Cup Final)
22 May 1976 West Germany – Spain 2–0 (Euro 1976 Qualifier)
22 February 1978 West Germany – England 2–1 (Friendly)
2 April 1980 West Germany – Austria 1–0 (Friendly)
22 September 1982 West Germany – Belgium 0–0 (Friendly)
17 November 1985 West Germany – Czechoslovakia 2–2 (1986 World Cup qualifier)
17 June 1988 West Germany – Spain 2–0 (Euro 1988 Group match)
19 October 1988 West Germany – Netherlands 0–0 (1990 World Cup qualifier)
26 March 1996 Germany – Denmark 2–0 (Friendly)
9 October 1999 Germany – Turkey 0–0 (Euro 2000 qualifier)
1 September 2001 Germany – England 1–5 (2002 World Cup qualifier)

Concerts

Other uses
The stadium was the setting of a skit for Monty Python's Flying Circus in 1972, for The Philosophers' Football Match, in which Greek Philosophers played German Philosophers (plus Franz Beckenbauer) and the Greeks winning the game with a last-minute goal from Socrates. However, the skit was filmed instead at the Grünwalder Stadion.

Parts of the 1975 film Rollerball were shot on the (then) futuristic site surrounding the stadium.

American rock band Guns N' Roses filmed parts of their Estranged video there when they visited Munich in June 1993.

The Olympic Stadium also hosted Motorcycle speedway when it held the 1989 World Final on 2 September 1989. Denmark's Hans Nielsen won his third World Championship with a 15-point maximum from his five rides. Simon Wigg of England finished in second place after defeating countryman Jeremy Doncaster in a run-off to decide the final podium places after both had finished with 12 points from their five rides. Three time champion Erik Gundersen of Denmark finished in fourth place with 11 points. Gundersen, the defending World Champion, missed finishing outright second when his bike's engine expired while he was leading Heat 9 of the World Final.

In 2021, the stadium was visited during the fourth episode of the ninth season of Belgian reality series De Mol for a football-themed assignment.

The stadium is also used for American football.

See also
Tensile and membrane structures

References

External links

Olympiastadion di Monaco di Baviera
Official site
Olympic Stadium review by a+t architecture publishers

Athletics (track and field) venues in Germany
FC Bayern Munich
TSV 1860 Munich
Sports venues in Munich
1974 FIFA World Cup stadiums
Football venues in Munich
Munich
Tensile membrane structures
High-tech architecture
UEFA Euro 1988 stadiums
Tourist attractions in Munich
Rugby union stadiums in Germany
American football venues in Germany
Venues of the 1972 Summer Olympics
Olympic athletics venues
Olympic equestrian venues
Olympic football venues
Olympic modern pentathlon venues
UEFA European Championship final stadiums
Sports venues completed in 1972
1972 establishments in West Germany